The Journal of Vacation Marketing is a quarterly peer-reviewed academic journal that covers the field of marketing as related to the tourism, hospitality, and events industries. The editor-in-chief is J. S. Perry Hobson (Taylor's University). It was established in 1994 and is published by SAGE Publications.

Abstracting and indexing 
'The journal is abstracted and indexed in ABI/INFORM and Scopus.

External links 
 

SAGE Publishing academic journals
English-language journals
Marketing journals
Quarterly journals
Publications established in 1994